The Demise of Herman Durer (Dutch: De Verwording van Herman Dürer) is a 1979 Dutch film directed by Leon de Winter.

Cast
Ab Abspoel	... 	Vader
Joop Admiraal	... 	Reclasseringsambtenaar
Henny Alma	... 	Moeder
immy Berghout	... 	Peter
Jody Buchman	... 	Karl
Rob Fruithof		
Marjan Geveling		
Felix Jan Kuipers	... 	Herman Dürer
Vivian Lampe	... 	Wilma
Juliane Melchthal... 	Sabine
Onno Molenkamp	... 	teacher
Miek Smit	... 	Joyce
Ed van Gils	... 	Jacques
Cor Witschge	... 	Taxichauffeur

Production
According to Peter Cowie of the International Film Guide, this was the first Dutch feature to be shown at alternative art houses in the Netherlands and the first to be wholly financed by the government.

References

External links 
 

Dutch drama films
1979 films
1970s Dutch-language films
Films directed by Leon de Winter